The enzyme methylumbelliferyl-acetate deacetylase (EC 3.1.1.56, esterase D) catalyzes the reaction

4-methylumbelliferyl acetate + H2O  4-methylumbelliferone + acetate

This enzyme belongs to the family of hydrolases, specifically those acting on carboxylic ester bonds.  The systematic name is 4-methylumbelliferyl-acetate acylhydrolase. This enzyme is also called esterase D.

References

 

EC 3.1.1
Enzymes of unknown structure